Erging may refer to:

Ergyng, early medieval Welsh kingdom
Indoor rower, type of indoor rower